Melville Henry Cane (April 15, 1879 – March 10, 1980) was an American poet and lawyer. He studied at Columbia University, and was the author of the influential book, Making a Poem (1953).

Early life and education
As a Columbia University student in 1900, Cane worked as a reporter at the New York Evening Post and also wrote poetry. He also co-wrote the 1900 Varsity Show at Columbia, writing lyrics for libretto The Governor's Vrouw (1900), a two-act comic opera  he co-wrote with Henry Sydnor Harrison, while John Erskine write the music. Cane earned his law degree in 1903 and later specialized in copyright law.

Career
Cane was a legal counsel to notable writers like Sinclair Lewis, Upton Sinclair, Ayn Rand, William Saroyan, and Thomas Wolfe and also served on the board of directors for Harcourt Brace Jovanovich Inc. Cane was also awarded the Frost Medal by the Poetry Society of America in 1971 for lifetime achievement.

Some of Cane's works are: January Garden (1926), Behind Dark Places''' (1930), And Pastures New (1956) and Snow Towards Evening'' (1974).

Bibliography

References

External links 

 Finding aid to Melville Cane papers at Columbia University. Rare Book & Manuscript Library.

1879 births
1980 deaths
American centenarians
American lawyers
American male poets
American poets
Men centenarians

Columbia Law School alumni
Columbia College (New York) alumni